Sandgroper may refer to:
Sandgroper (insect), a type of burrowing insect found in Western Australia
 Sandgroper, nickname for an inhabitant or native of Western Australia
 The Sandgropers, a nickname for the representative Australian rules football team from Western Australia
 A beachcomber
 A Louisiana (US) tent camper